The men's 1500 metre freestyle event at the 1972 Olympic Games took place between September 3 and 4. This swimming event used freestyle swimming, which means that the method of the stroke is not regulated (unlike backstroke, breaststroke, and butterfly events). Nearly all swimmers use the front crawl or a variant of that stroke. Because an Olympic-size swimming pool is 50 metres long, this race consisted of 30 lengths of the pool.

Medalists

Results

Heats
Heat 1

Heat 2

Heat 3

Heat 4

Heat 5

Heat 6

Final

Key: WR = World record

References

Men's freestyle 1500 metre
Men's events at the 1972 Summer Olympics